The Fear of Women (German:Die Furcht vor dem Weibe) is a 1921 German silent drama film directed by Hanna Henning and starring Bernd Aldor, Wilhelm Diegelmann and Otto Gebühr. The film was based on a novel by Georg Engel. It premiered in Berlin on 23 June 1921. The film's art direction was by Julian Ballenstedt.

Cast
In alphabetical order
 Bernd Aldor as Stubengelehrter 
 Wilhelm Diegelmann   
 Otto Gebühr   
 Robert Leffler   
 Marija Leiko as Reederstochter 
 Max Pohl   
 Paula Conrada Schlenther
 Hermine Straßmann-Witt   
 Ernst Wurmser   
 Toni Zimmerer

References

Bibliography
 Grange, William. Cultural Chronicle of the Weimar Republic.Scarecrow Press, 2008.

External links

1921 films
Films of the Weimar Republic
German silent feature films
German drama films
Films directed by Hanna Henning
1921 drama films
German black-and-white films
Silent drama films
1920s German films
1920s German-language films